Atepa is a genus of moths belonging to family Tortricidae.

Species
 Atepa colaptes Razowski, 1992
 Atepa cordobana Razowski, 1992
 Atepa sinaloana Razowski, 1992
 Atepa triplagata (Walsingham, 1914)

See also
 List of Tortricidae genera

References

 , 2005: World Catalogue of Insects vol. 5 Tortricidae.
 , 1992, J. Res Lepid. 30(1990): 14.

External links
 tortricidae.com

Euliini
Taxa named by Edward Meyrick
Tortricidae genera